John Thompson (died 1810) was a registrar of lands in the Western District of the Territory of Orleans and judge of the Superior Court of the Territory of Orleans.

Thompson came to Louisiana from Kentucky in 1805 and was charged with opening the Western District land office in Opelousas, Louisiana. On September 17, 1808, Thompson was appointed by President Thomas Jefferson to be a judge of the Superior Court of the Territory of Orleans in place of William Sprigg who had returned to the Ohio Supreme Court.

Thompson died in February 1810 in New Orleans, and was succeeded by Francois Xavier Martin.

References

Year of birth unknown
1810 deaths
Justices of the Louisiana Supreme Court
United States federal judges appointed by Thomas Jefferson
19th-century American judges